Kalkuni  is a village in the southern state of Karnataka, India. It is located in the Malavalli taluk of Mandya district in Karnataka.

Demographics
 India census, Kalkuni had a population of 8328 with 4342 males and 3986 females.

See also
 Mandya
 Districts of Karnataka

References

External links
 http://Mandya.nic.in/

Villages in Mandya district